A Decade of Steely Dan is a compilation album by Steely Dan, released in 1985. It was the band's first compilation specifically for the compact disc market, and was certified a gold record by the RIAA.

The album acts as a de facto singles package, including every Top 40 hit enjoyed by the band prior to its release with the exceptions of "Josie" from 1978 and "Time Out of Mind" from 1981. The remaining six tracks include two additional charting singles "My Old School" and 'Kid Charlemagne," a cover of Duke Ellington's "East St. Louis Toodle-Oo" which had been issued as a promotional single and "Bad Sneakers" which missed the Billboard Hot 100 as a single, and two album tracks, "Bodhisattva" and "Babylon Sisters." The version of "FM (No Static at All)" on this compilation is the original album version from the FM soundtrack. The CD is currently out of print but the album is available on music streaming and digital download services.

Track listing
All tracks written by Walter Becker and Donald Fagen except where noted.

Personnel
Taken from the liner notes to the box set Citizen Steely Dan; all individuals other than Fagen may not appear on tracks listed.
 Donald Fagen — vocals, keyboards
 Walter Becker — bass guitar, guitars, backing vocals
 Randy Brecker, Chuck Findley, Slyde Hyde, Lanny Morgan, Lou McCreary, John Rotella, Ernie Watts — brass instruments
 Tom Scott — woodwind instruments, horn arrangements
 Wayne Shorter — saxophones
 Pete Christlieb, Jim Horn, Plas Johnson, Jackie Kelso, Lanny Morgan, Bill Perkins — flutes, saxophones
 Walter Kane, George Marge — bass clarinets
 Victor Feldman — electric piano, percussion
 Paul Griffin, Don Grolnick, Michael Omartian, David Paich — keyboards
 Jeff Baxter, Larry Carlton, Cosmo Creek, Denny Dias, Jay Graydon, Steve Khan, Hugh McCracken, Dean Parks, Elliott Randall, Lee Ritenour — guitars
 Chuck Rainey — bass guitar
 Crusher Bennett, Gary Coleman, Steve Gadd, Jim Gordon, Jim Hodder, Rick Marotta, Jeff Porcaro, Bernard Purdie — drums, percussion
 Patti Austin, Venetta Fields, Frank Floyd, Diva Gray, Gordon Grody, Lani Groves, Patricia Hall, Clydie King, Myrna Matthews, Sherlie Matthews, Michael McDonald, Leslie Miller, David Palmer, Zachary Sanders, Timothy B. Schmit, Toni Wine — backing vocals

Production personnel
 Gary Katz — producer
 Roger Nichols — engineer, mastering
 Bob Ludwig — mastering
 Glenn Meadows — mastering (1996 reissue)
 Jimmie Haskell, Rob Mounsey — horn arrangements
 Johnny Mandel — string arrangements

References

1985 compilation albums
Steely Dan compilation albums
MCA Records compilation albums